The  is a 17.8 km railway line in Gifu Prefecture, Japan, operated by Central Japan Railway Company (JR Central). It connects Tajimi Station in the city of Tajimi via Kani to Mino-Ōta Station in Minokamo. The name of the line includes a kanji from each of the terminal stations.

Operations
During the day, service operates at approximately 30 minute intervals. In addition to trains running between Tajimi and Mino-Ōta Stations, there are also trains that enter the Takayama Main Line and run through to Gifu Station. During weekday morning and evening rush hours and on Saturday mornings, a train serves commuters by going to Nagoya Station.

Stations

History

The line traces its origin to the Tōnō (Eastern Mino) line, an 11.9 km,  gauge railway that opened in 1918.

Passenger trains were replaced by DMUs in 1934, and steam locomotives ceased operating on the line in 1969. From 1 April 1987, with the privatization and division of the Japanese National Railways (JNR) into regional companies, the Taita Line became part of JR Central.

CTC signalling was commissioned in 1993.

References

 
Lines of Central Japan Railway Company
Rail transport in Gifu Prefecture
1067 mm gauge railways in Japan
Railway lines opened in 1918